Stan Katz may refer to:
 Stan Katz (psychologist)
 Stan Katz (broadcaster)